Johann Herolt, also known as Discipulus (died August 1468) was a Dominican preacher. Herolt has been described as "the most prolific, skillful, and honored writer of sermon books in fifteenth-century Europe". He was "one of the leading figures of a new Dominican spirituality in fifteenth-century Germany which emphasized the practical goals of pastoral work over mystical study".

As lector and prior of the Dominican monastery in Nuremberg, Herolt was a colleague of Johannes Nider. Herolt was also vicar of Nuremberg's Dominican convent, the cloister of St Katharine, which he and Nider reformed in 1428, appointing Gertrud Gwichtmacherin as prioress. He was prior at Nuremberg from 1437 to 1443.

Herolt's Sermones discipuli de tempore et de sanctis was the most widely reprinted sermon collection of the fifteenth century. Herolt collected exemplary stories for use in sermons, and these story collections - one thematic, one of miracles of the Virgin Mary, and one of miracles of the saints - also circulated in manuscript and were widely reprinted as Promptuaria exemplorum.

Herolt's Advent, Christmas and New Year sermons to the Nuremberg convent in 1436 - his only work in the German vernacular, Der Rosengart - have recently been translated and published.

Works
 Liber discipuli de eruditione Christifidelium, 1416
 Sermones de tempore, 1418
 Sermones de sanctis, 1432
 Promptuaria exemplorum
 Quadragesimale, 1434
 Applicationes rerum naturalium ad sermones, 1463

References

Year of birth unknown
1468 deaths
15th-century German writers
German Dominicans
German sermon writers
German male writers
15th-century Christian monks